"Hot n Cold" is a song by American singer Katy Perry. The song was written by Perry, Dr. Luke, and Max Martin and produced by Luke and Benny Blanco for her second studio album, One of the Boys (2008). It was released as the album's second single on September 9, 2008. The lyrics address an unstable romantic relationship caused by a partner's mood swings.

The song reached number three on the Billboard Hot 100, becoming Perry's second consecutive top-five single, following "I Kissed a Girl". It also became Perry's second top-five single in the United Kingdom, Australia, Ireland, and New Zealand, and topped the charts in Finland, Germany, Canada, Norway, and Denmark, among others. "Hot n Cold" has sold over 5.8 million pure sales in the US, making it one of Perry's highest-selling singles in the nation.

To promote "Hot n Cold", Perry marked the song's live debut with a performance on NBC's Today. She also performed the song at the 2008 MTV Europe Music Awards, which she hosted. The song's music video, which was directed by Alan Ferguson, was released on October 1, 2008, and features Perry as a bride who is about to marry her fiancé, who experiences a daydream in which she pursues him after he flees from the wedding. "Hot n Cold" was nominated for the Grammy Award for Best Female Pop Vocal Performance at the 52nd Annual Grammy Awards. Perry has also performed the song on all of her tours: Hello Katy Tour, California Dreams Tour, Prismatic World Tour, and Witness: The Tour.

Background and composition
"Hot n Cold" was written by Perry, Dr. Luke, and Max Martin and produced by Dr. Luke and Benny Blanco. It was recorded in December 2007 in three studios: Dr. Luke's Studios in New York City, Conway Recording Studio in Hollywood, California, and Legacy Recording Studios in New York City. It was mixed in MixStar Studios in Virginia Beach. The collaboration between Perry and Dr. Luke was set up by record executives at Capitol Records, who felt that One of the Boys was lacking an "undeniable smash or two", and the two co-wrote "I Kissed a Girl" and "Hot n Cold" as a result. Perry revealed that the song was originally considered for release as the album's first single, before "I Kissed a Girl" was chosen.

Written in the key of G major, "Hot n Cold" is a pop and dance-pop song which utilizes guitars and synthesizers. It has a length of three minutes and forty seconds (3:40), and runs at a moderately fast tempo of 132 beats per minute. The lyrics of the song address a lover of Perry whose mood swings are affecting the couple's relationship. The song opens with Perry confronting her former partner over his frequent changes of mind, singing "You change your mind like a girl changes clothes / Yeah you PMS / Like a bitch, I would know". In the chorus, she uses antonyms to describe her partner's mood changes, with the chorus of the song including the lines, "You're hot then you're cold / You're yes then you're no / You're in then you're out / You're up then you're down".

Critical reception
Alex Fletcher of Digital Spy gave the song three out of five stars, saying "this track doesn't live up to the hype surrounding its singer, but the choppy guitars and whooshing synths have a certain charm." In his review for musicOMH, Darren Harvey called "Hot n Cold" a "Tiffany-style '80s pop number". ChartAttack noted the "frenetic dance-pop" of the track. In a less positive review, Sal Cinquemani from Slant Magazine criticized the song, saying "Perry confuses political incorrectness with being subversive on tracks like 'Hot n Cold', in which she, in the process of skewering guys who change their minds 'like girls change clothes', just winds up sounding mildly sexist." Jon Caramanica of The New York Times compared the song to "U + Ur Hand" by Pink, which was also produced by Dr. Luke, saying that it does not share the latter's "passion". Lizzie Ennever of BBC felt the track was not "the most single-worthy song". The Guardian wrote that the song "didn't seem to capture the public's imagination" the way her previous single "I Kissed a Girl" did. The song was nominated for the Grammy Award for Best Female Pop Vocal Performance at the 52nd Annual Grammy Awards, but lost to Beyoncé's "Halo".

Chart performance

"Hot n Cold" debuted on the US Billboard Hot 100 at number 88 on June 28, 2008, due to strong digital downloads after the album's release, falling off the chart the next week. It re-entered the Hot 100 on August 23, again at number 88. The song peaked at number three on the Hot 100 on November 22, making it her second top-three hit after "I Kissed a Girl". "Hot n Cold" was in the top ten for 18 weeks, spending more time in the top ten than Perry's previous single "I Kissed a Girl", which spent 14 weeks. The song was also a bigger radio hit than "I Kissed a Girl", becoming Perry's first number one on both US Mainstream Top 40 and Adult Top 40 radio charts. It remained in the Hot 100 for a total of 39 weeks. As of August 2020, "Hot n Cold" has been certified 8 times platinum by the Recording Industry Association of America (RIAA) and sold 5.8 million copies in the United States, making it Perry's sixth best-selling single in the country.

In Canada, the song debuted at number 73 and reached the number one position on the chart on November 20. It was later certified six times platinum. The song peaked at number four on the UK Singles Chart on December 7, and was certified double platinum. "Hot n Cold" debuted on the German Singles Chart at number two due to strong digital download sales, before topping the chart and spending eight consecutive weeks at number one in Germany. In Australia, the single debuted in the top 50, before reaching its peak at number four. It has since been certified five times platinum in the country. The song peaked at number one in the Czech Republic and spent ten consecutive weeks at the top of the chart. "Hot n Cold" reached the number one position in Denmark, later being certified two-times-platinum, and hit number one in Austria before being certified platinum.

Music video

The video begins with Perry at a wedding, about to exchange vows with her diffident fiancé Alexander (played by actor/model Alexander Francis Rodriguez). Perry says her vows, but Alexander hesitates and the church anxiously waits for him to say "I do". Perry appears frustrated and the music begins to play, with the congregation dancing as disco lights flash. Perry begins to sing the song to Alexander before he flees the altar. She pursues him, and they proceed to play a cat-and-mouse game. Perry corners him in a warehouse, and Alexander is pulled into an audience and forced to crowd-surf while watching Perry perform the song on stage. He manages to escape but walks out to find Perry in her wedding dress surrounded by several other brides carrying baseball bats. Perry confronts him, but he is able to get away.

Perry and the other brides chase after him. When Alexander pulls out his phone, Perry is on the screen singing to him. He flees the warehouse and finds Perry outside wearing urban clothing, surrounded by dancers dressed similarly. When he turns around, he discovers that he has been cornered by Perry and the group of angry brides. He stumbles and the dancers surround him as he lies on the ground, before Perry approaches him leading a zebra on a leash. Alexander blinks and finds himself back at the altar in the church, revealing that the previous events were just a daydream. The priest asks him again if he accepts his vows, and this time he says "I do". The crowd in the church breaks out into cheers and sighs of relief as Perry runs victoriously down the aisle with him.

Perry's friends Jadyn Maria and Shannon Woodward appear in the music video as bridesmaids, and her parents Keith and Mary Hudson also make cameos. The video for "Hot n Cold" was recorded in Los Angeles in September 2008 and released on October 1, 2008. It was directed by Alan Ferguson. Rolling Stone described the music video as "a colorful cat-and-mouse chase that's equal parts goofy and glam." Capital FM wrote that the video "had us in stitches". The music video reached over 1 billion views on YouTube as of November 2020.

Live performances

Perry made the live television premiere performance of "Hot n Cold" on NBC's Today on August 29, 2008. Perry performed the song live at the 2008 MTV Europe Music Awards in Liverpool, which she also hosted, on November 6 to close the show. The song was also performed as the opener at the 2008 YouTube Live event on November 22, 2008. Perry performed the song with Taylor Swift at the Staples Center show during the Fearless Tour on April 15, 2010. The song has been included in the setlists of Perry's Hello Katy, California Dreams, and Prismatic World tours. During the California Dreams Tour, Perry performed a "magic trick" that involved her changing into 7 different outfits during the number. Perry performed the song on her The Prismatic World Tour in a slow jazz version with her dressing in a pink-catsuit with her dancers dressed in a similar way. It was also part of the setlist of Perry's Witness: The Tour in a medley with "Last Friday Night (T.G.I.F)", a song from her album Teenage Dream.

Usage in media
Perry filmed a performance of a version of the song with puppet character Elmo from Sesame Street, which was intended to teach children about antonyms. The clip was originally scheduled to run on the 41st-season premiere of the educational children's program on September 27, 2010, however, the performance, which was uploaded to YouTube earlier, garnered controversy over the amount of cleavage Perry had on display in the video. Before the scheduled airing, Sesame Workshop announced that after controversy over the clip, "We have decided we will not air the segment on the television broadcast of Sesame Street, which is aimed at preschoolers. Katy Perry fans will still be able to view the video on YouTube." Perry mocked the controversy shortly afterward in a skit during her appearance on Saturday Night Live as a musical guest, wearing an Elmo-themed shirt which showed large amounts of cleavage.

The song is used as the theme music for MasterChef Australia and its associated TV ads.

Track listing
 CD Single
 "Hot n Cold" (Album Version) – 3:40
 "Hot n Cold" (Instrumental) – 3:40
 "Hot n Cold" (A Cappella) – 3:34
 "Hot n Cold" (Rock Mix) – 3:41
 "Hot n Cold" (Innerpartysystem Remix) – 4:40
 "Hot n Cold" (Bimbo Jones Radio Edit) – 3:50
 "Hot n Cold" (Manhattan Clique Radio Edit) – 3:54
 "Hot n Cold" (Jason Nevins Radio Edit) – 3:57

Remixes

Almighty Mixes
 "Hot n Cold" (Almighty 12" Anthem Mix) – 8:00
 "Hot n Cold" (Almighty 12" Anthem Instrumental) – 8:00
 "Hot n Cold" (Almighty 12" Anthem Dub) – 7:14
 "Hot n Cold" (Almighty Anthem Radio Edit) – 4:01
 Bimbo Jones Mixes
 "Hot n Cold" (Bimbo Jones Club Mix) – 8:02
 "Hot n Cold" (Bimbo Jones Instrumental) – 8:10
 "Hot n Cold" (Bimbo Jones Radio Edit) – 3:50
Manhattan Clique Mixes
 "Hot n Cold" (Manhattan Clique Extended Club Mix) – 4:40
 "Hot n Cold" (Manhattan Clique Radio Edit) – 3:54 
Jason Nevins Mixes
 "Hot n Cold" (Jason Nevins Club Mix) – 7:21
 "Hot n Cold" (Jason Nevins Radio Edit) – 3:57
Dr. Luke Mix
 "Hot n Cold" (Rock Mix) – 3:41
Innerpartysystem Mix
 "Hot n Cold" (Innerpartysystem Remix) – 4:40
Marsheaux Mix
 "Hot n Cold" (Marsheaux Remix) – 4:23
Yelle Mix
 "Hot n Cold" (Yelle Remix) – 4:07

Credits and personnel
Credits adapted from One of the Boys album liner notes.

 Katy Perry – vocals, songwriter
 Dr. Luke – producer, songwriter, programmer, bass, drums, guitar
 Max Martin – songwriter, guitars
 Benny Blanco – producer, programmer, drums
 Steven Wolf – programming
 Şerban Ghenea – mixing
 John Hanes – mix engineer
 Emily Wright – engineer
 Sam Holland – engineer
 Nick Banns – engineer
 Tatiana Gottwald – engineer
 Tina Kennedy – engineer

Charts

Weekly charts

Year-end charts

Decade-end charts

Certifications

Release history

Cover versions

Woe, Is Me version

Atlanta-based metalcore band, Woe, Is Me covered the track for the compilation album Punk Goes Pop Volume 03., which was released on November 2, 2010. The song was leaked on October 6, 2010, and was officially released as a single for digital download on October 21, 2010. MTV News described the band's cover as "50 percent faithful to the original and..... 50 percent punishing, metal and gravel-throated growls. It must be heard to be believed."

The Baseballs version
"Hot n Cold" was covered by the German rockabilly cover band The Baseballs in 2009 from their debut album Strike!. Their cover charted in the band's home country of Germany, as well as in Finland and Switzerland.

Charts

Other cover versions
 The song was covered by British ska and indie band Kid British on their 2009 EP iTunes Live: London Festival '09.
 Selena Gomez & the Scene performed the song during their 2009 Selena Gomez & the Scene: Live in Concert tour.

See also
List of Romanian Top 100 number ones of the 2000s

References

2008 singles
Katy Perry songs
Number-one singles in Austria
Canadian Hot 100 number-one singles
Number-one singles in Denmark
European Hot 100 Singles number-one singles
Number-one singles in Finland
Number-one singles in Germany
Number-one singles in Hungary
Dutch Top 40 number-one singles
Number-one singles in Norway
Number-one singles in Poland
Number-one singles in Romania
Number-one singles in Russia
Number-one singles in Switzerland
Number-one singles in Turkey
Record Report Pop Rock General number-one singles
Songs written by Max Martin
Songs written by Katy Perry
Songs written by Dr. Luke
Song recordings produced by Dr. Luke
Woe, Is Me songs
Dance-pop songs
2008 songs
Music videos directed by Alan Ferguson (director)
Capitol Records singles
Rise Records singles
Fearless Records singles